Hans Sohnle (17 September 1895 – 24 March 1976) was a German art director. He frequently collaborated with Otto Erdmann on set designs.

Selected filmography

 The Loves of Käthe Keller (1919)
 The Woman in Doctor's Garb (1920)
 Kean (1921)
 The Solemn Oath (1921)
 Seafaring Is Necessary (1921)
 The Curse of Silence (1922)
 The Homecoming of Odysseus (1922)
 Two Worlds (1922)
 The Weather Station (1923)
 Horrido (1924)
 Prater (1924)
 The Stolen Professor (1924)
 The Woman in Flames (1924)
 Joyless Street (1925)
 Flight Around the World (1925)
 The Golden Calf (1925)
 Shadows of the Metropolis (1925)
 The Third Squadron (1926)
 The Great Duchess (1926)
 The Poacher (1926)
 Professor Imhof  (1926)
 Tea Time in the Ackerstrasse (1926)
 The Pride of the Company (1926)
 The White Slave (1927)
 The City of a Thousand Delights (1927)
 Queen of the Boulevards (1927)
 The Bordello in Rio (1927)
 Light-Hearted Isabel (1927)
 The Impostor (1927)
 The Woman Who Couldn't Say No (1927)
 Orient (1928)
 Who Invented Divorce? (1928)
 Five Anxious Days (1928)
 A Girl with Temperament (1928)
 The Secret Courier (1928)
 The Lady and the Chauffeur (1928)
 The Carousel of Death  (1928)
 The Story of a Little Parisian (1928)
 The Veil Dancer (1929)
 Land Without Women (1929)
 The Adjutant of the Czar (1929)
 Only on the Rhine  (1930)
 Love in the Ring (1930)
 Road to Rio (1931)
 Marriage with Limited Liability (1931)
 The Mad Bomberg (1932)
 A Night in Paradise (1932)
 Madame Wants No Children (1933)
 The Peak Scaler (1933)
 Inge and the Millions (1933)
 A Day Will Come (1934)
 Just Once a Great Lady (1934)
 One Too Many on Board (1935)
 My Life for Maria Isabella (1935)
 Regine (1935)
 Escapade (1936)
 A Hoax (1936)
 A Woman of No Importance (1936)
 Fridericus (1937)
 The Impossible Mister Pitt (1938)
 In the Name of the People (1939)
 The Leghorn Hat (1939)
 The Little Residence (1942)
 The Endless Road (1943)
 The Disturbed Wedding Night (1950)
 Who Is This That I Love? (1950)
 The Exchange (1952)
 Fanfare of Marriage (1953)
 Must We Get Divorced? (1953)
 The Little Town Will Go to Sleep (1954)
 A Girl Without Boundaries (1955)
 Reaching for the Stars (1955)
 Two Bavarians in St. Pauli (1956)
 Between Munich and St. Pauli (1957)

References

Bibliography
Chandler, Charlotte. Marlene: Marlene Dietrich, A Personal Biography. Simon and Schuster, 2011.

External links

1895 births
1976 deaths
German art directors
People from Beeskow